The 2014–15 season is Loyola's 6th season in the Philippines premier league, the UFL Division 1.

Current squad

Overview

References 

United Football League
F.C. Meralco Manila seasons